The 1952 St. Louis Browns season was a season in American baseball. It involved the Browns finishing 7th in the American League with a record of 64 wins and 90 losses. This was the franchise's penultimate season in St. Louis.

Offseason
 November 27, 1951: Al Widmar, Sherm Lollar, and Tom Upton were traded by the Browns to the Chicago White Sox for Joe DeMaestri, Gordon Goldsberry, Dick Littlefield, Gus Niarhos, and Jim Rivera.

Regular season
In 1952, Rogers Hornsby, an alleged former member of the Ku Klux Klan, took over as manager of the Browns. Despite past accusations of racism, Hornsby was less hesitant to use pitcher Satchel Paige than Indians manager Lou Boudreau had been four years before. Paige was so effective that when Hornsby was fired by Browns owner Bill Veeck, his successor Marty Marion seemed not to want to risk going more than three games without using Paige in some form. By July 4, with Paige having worked in 25 games, Casey Stengel named him to the American League All-Star team, making him the first black pitcher on an AL All-Star team. The All-Star game was cut short after five innings due to rain and Paige never got in. Stengel resolved to name him to the team the following year. Paige finished the year 12–10 with a 3.07 ERA for a team that lost ninety games.

Season standings

Record vs. opponents

Notable transactions
 July 28, 1952: Darrell Johnson and Jim Rivera were traded by the Browns to the Chicago White Sox for Jay Porter and Ray Coleman.
 August 14, 1952: Jim Delsing, Ned Garver, Bud Black and Dave Madison were traded by the Browns to the Detroit Tigers for Dick Littlefield, Marlin Stuart, Don Lenhardt and Vic Wertz.

Roster

Player stats

Batting

Starters by position
Note: Pos = Position; G = Games played; AB = At bats; H = Hits; Avg. = Batting average; HR = Home runs; RBI = Runs batted in

Other batters
Note: G = Games played; AB = At bats; H = Hits; Avg. = Batting average; HR = Home runs; RBI = Runs batted in

Pitching

Starting pitchers
Note: G = Games pitched; IP = Innings pitched; W = Wins; L = Losses; ERA = Earned run average; SO = Strikeouts

Other pitchers
Note: G = Games pitched; IP = Innings pitched; W = Wins; L = Losses; ERA = Earned run average; SO = Strikeouts

Relief pitchers
Note: G = Games pitched; W = Wins; L = Losses; SV = Saves; ERA = Earned run average; SO = Strikeouts

Farm system

Notes

References

1952 St. Louis Browns team at Baseball-Reference
1952 St. Louis Browns season at baseball-almanac.com

St. Louis Browns seasons
Saint Louis Browns season
St Louis Browns